Clint Bajada is a television and radio personality. He hosted with success a variety of local shows including 'Coyotic', 'clint@nine', 'HappyDays', and 'STR82dPOINT'. 
He is also known for his Saturday morning Radio show which during the Malta Broadcasting Authority was classified as the most popular radio show in Malta in various audience surveys.

Bajada started his career as a radio presenter with Super ONE Radio at the age of 15. At young age of just 16  he appeared in a local Sunday Television show called ‘Kulhadd fil-Millenju’ together with presenters Claire Fabri & Ray Azzopardi. During his career he was involved in different TV programs including talk shows, news, current affairs and entertainment.

During 2007, Bajada hosted Coyotic. This programme was a dancing competition between 30 girls. They were judged for their dancing abilities, personality and looks.

As from year 2010 to-date, Clint hosted the popular Saturday mid-morning show 'Clint on ONE'. It is considered as the top music TV-Radio show currently followed on local stations. Within 120 minutes, Bajada captures local celebrity interviews, live acoustic acts, visiting guest DJs, new music albums & videos, Interactive SMS, E-mail and Facebook and god knows what we will think of for the future…

Clint on ONE is aired simultaneously on Radio & TV from a state-of-the-art studio in MTV style, every Saturday from 11hrs till 13hrs.

In September 2013, Clint Bajada has been appointed head of ONE Radio, taking over from Ray Azzopardi, who held the position for 22 years.

Shows presented
TV shows
2010 to date: Clint on ONE – Radio & TV Music show
2013: Stream – Youth Discussion programme/Pre General Election
2007: Coyotic – Dancing competition show
2006: Clint@Nine – Reality & Entertainment show
2005/2006: Happy days – Entertainment & Magazine show
2004/2006: STR82DPOINT - Youth Discussion Programme
2003-2007: Minn Nicca 'l Barra - Feast programs
2003: Ghal Kull Hadd - Sunday Afternoon Entertainment show
2003: Summer Break - Sunday Afternoon Entertainment show 
2002: Chiara & Friends- Sunday Morning Entertainment show
2001: Wotz on - Youth programme
2000: Kullhadd fil-Millennju - Sunday Afternoon show

Other contributions
Journalist & article contributor
2003: Team – Investigative journalism
2003: "Qribna" - Political journalism

Newspaper contributor
2008: it-Torca – Weekly article contributor

Special Appearances
October 2016: Presenter of Għanja tal-Poplu 40th edition celebration, during Notte Bianca and live on National Television - Capital City, Valletta.
July 2016: Judge for L-Għanja tal-Poplu 2016.
June 2016: MC/Warm-up Host for Steve Aoke at Isle of MTV Malta
January - December 2016: Board member as part of a working committee for the 7th World Summit of Arts and Culture - Valletta 2016 - IFACCA & Arts Council Malta.   
December 2015: DJ & MC, New Year's Eve National Celebrations - Capital City, Valletta.
July 2015: MC/Warm-up Host for Martin Garrix at Isle of MTV Malta
December 2014: DJ & MC, New Year's Eve National Celebrations - Capital City, Valletta.
June 2014: MC/Warm-up Host for Enrique Iglesias at Isle of MTV Malta
April 2014: Presenter, 10th Anniversary Celebrations of EU accession, Valletta
March 2014: Presenter, Ghanja tal-Poplu Song Festival
December 2013: DJ & MC, New Year's Eve National Celebrations - Capital City, Valletta.
December 2013: Co-Producer & Live voice over intros, ONE Tribute
August 2013: Presenter, Johnny Logan Live in Concert
June 2013: MC/Warm-up Host for Rudimental and Jessie J at Isle of MTV Malta
Jan-March 2013: Entertainment coordinator and main Presenter for all Labour Party (PL) Mass Meetings. PL won the national election by over 35,000 votes on the Nationalist Party. PL won a massive 55% of the votes
December 2012: Co-Producer, ONE Tribute - ONE Productions Limited
September 2012: Presenter, ONE TV Launch of New Autumn Schedule
September 2012: Production/Coordination, jingles/sweepers of KISS on DAB+
August 2012: Presenter, Smokie Live in Concert
December 2011: Co-Producer, ONE Tribute
October 2007: Judge for the Malta Music Awards 2007
December 2006: Produced and presented 12 days build up campaign for the Malta Labour Party fund raising marathon
December 2006: Chairman of the Jury Panel of the Malta International TV Song Festival
September 2006: Producer and presenter of ONE Productions Ltd launch for October/December 2006 schedule of ONE TV and Super ONE Radio. An important launch which leads to a change in the stations' brand image and the first day of digital transmissions
August 2006: Producer & Presenter of the 15th anniversary celebration of Super ONE Radio

References

External links
ONE Productions Ltd Official Web Site
Facebook

Maltese television presenters
Maltese radio personalities
Living people
People from Paola, Malta
Year of birth missing (living people)